A leadership election was held by the Pan-Malaysian Islamic Party (PAS) on 6 and 7 November 2021. It was won by incumbent President of PAS, Abdul Hadi Awang.

Timeline

October 
21 October 2021: Announcement of the nomination of Dewan Pemuda and Dewan Muslimat
23 October 2021: Final confirmation of the nomination of Dewan Pemuda and Dewan Muslimat
30 – 31 October 2021: The annual conference of the Youth Council took place at Corus Paradise Resort, Negeri Sembilan.
30 – 31 October 2021: The annual muktamar of Dewan Muslimat took place at the PAS Headquarters, Kuala Lumpur
30 October 2021: The annual muktamar of Dewan Ulamak took place at the Tahfiz Darul Ulum Complex, Seremban, Negeri Sembilan.
30 October 2021: Youth Council voting dan Dewan Muslimat
31 October 2021: Announcement of Youth Council election results dan Dewan Muslimat.

November 
4 November 2021: Announcement of PAS Central Committee election candidates
6 – 7 November 2021: PAS Annual General Meeting

Central Working Committee election results 
The following are the election results for the membership of the PAS Central Committee for the 2021-2023 session.

Permanent Chairman

Deputy Permanent Chairman

Auditor

President

Deputy President

Vice Presidents

Central Working Committee Members

References 

2021 elections in Malaysia
Pan-Malaysian Islamic Party leadership election
Malaysian Islamic Party leadership elections